Judith Fuchs (born 23 January 1990) is a German chess player who holds the FIDE title of Woman Grandmaster.

Chess career
Fuchs started playing chess at the age of five. From 1999 to 2007 she participated in German Girls' Championships. Fuchs won this tournament in 2000 (U10), 2006 (U16) and 2007 (U18). She participated in European Youth Chess Championships and World Youth Chess Championships. Fuchs has played for Germany in two Chess Olympiads (2008-2010). In 2012, she won Riga Technical University Open best women prize. In 2009 Fuchs was awarded the FIDE Woman International Master (WIM) title. In 2017, Fuchs achieved the FIDE Woman Grandmaster (WGM) title.

References

External links
 
 
 

1990 births
Living people
Sportspeople from Leipzig
German female chess players
Chess woman grandmasters
Chess Olympiad competitors